Redhawks or RedHawks may refer to:

 Cardiff Redhawks, a university ice hockey club
 Fargo-Moorhead RedHawks, an independent minor league baseball team
 Frontier Redhawks, a high school athletic program
 Malmö Redhawks, a Swedish ice hockey club
 Martin Methodist Redhawks, the collegiate athletic program of Martin Methodist College
 Miami RedHawks, the collegiate athletic program of Miami University in Ohio
 Oklahoma City RedHawks, a minor league baseball team now known as the Oklahoma City Dodgers
 Seattle Redhawks, the collegiate athletic program of Seattle University
 Montclair State University Red Hawks, the collegiate athletic program of Montclair State University
 Southeast Missouri State University
 Milton High School (Milton, Wisconsin) Redhawks, the high school athletic program of Milton High School in Wisconsin.
 Washington Redhawks, a media parody/satire intended to call attention to the Washington Redskins name controversy
 "Washington Redhawks", a team in the video game Blitz: The League
 Western Canada Redhawks, the athletic program of Western Canada High School

See also
 Red Hawk (disambiguation)
 Redhawk (disambiguation)